Cultural y Deportiva Leonesa, better known as Cultural Leonesa or La Cultural, is a Spanish football team based in León, in the autonomous community of Castile and Leon. Founded on 5 August 1923, it currently plays in Primera División RFEF – Group 1, holding home games at Estadio Reino de León, with a capacity of 13,346 seats.

Ahead of the 2014–15 season, the club released a kit designed to look like a tuxedo. The kit, which attracted huge attention in the media and social networking sites, was worn in a pre-season charity match in support of local charities for mining families.

History

Cultural y Deportiva Leonesa was founded on 5 August 1923.

In 1926, Cultural Leonesa won the Regional championship and in 1929 Cultural played the Segunda División B and promoted to the second division.

In 1931, the club ceased activity and several teams were created in the city with the aim to replace them, but after the Spanish Civil War, Cultural Leonesa came back to the competition.

In 1955, Cultural was promoted for the first time to La Liga, but they could only play one season in the Spanish top tier.

In 2011, the club was relegated to Tercera División due to unpaid debts to the players and took two years to recover the place in the third tier. In 2015, the Qatari Aspire Academy bought a controlling 99% of the shares of the club, thus avoiding its dissolution.

On 28 May 2017, Cultural was promoted to Segunda División after 42 years by defeating Barcelona B in the promotion play-offs. On 3 January 2018, Leeds United announced an official partnership with Cultural Leonesa's owners Aspire Academy in Qatar. The link up saw Leeds players Yosuke Ideguchi and Ouasim Bouy both join Cultural Leonesa on loan as part of the unique partnership.

On 2 June 2018, Cultural was relegated to the third level, after being defeated by Numancia on the last matchday. In the 2018–19 season the club played in Segunda División B, Group 1 and fought to be promoted back to the second tier. But it finished only in the 5th position. The club had a good start on the 2019–20 season, being in the 2nd position after first 16 games.  In the 2019–2020 season, they upset Atletico de Madrid in the Copa del Rey Round of 32.

On 2 December 2020, Cultural hired Iñigo Idiakez as Head Coach who came from Luton Town in EFL Championship and previously Leicester City and Derby County.

Club structure

Season to season

1 season in La Liga
15 seasons in Segunda División
2 seasons in Primera División RFEF
36 seasons in Segunda División B
33 seasons in Tercera División

Current squad
.

Reserve team

Out on loan

Coaching staff

Notable former players
Note: this list includes players that have appeared in at least 100 league games and/or have reached international status.

Famous coaches
 Miguel Ángel Rubio

Stadium

Reserve team
Júpiter Leonés is the reserve team of the club.

Founded in 1929, later known as Cultural de León and finally changed to its current name Cultural y Deportiva Leonesa "B" Jupiter Leonés. After the 2009–10, the team was dissolved after Cultural was relegated to Tercera División due to its debts. In 2014, it was re-founded as the reserve team and after three promotions it currently plays in Tercera División, the fourth tier, after gaining promotion in the Primera División Regional de Aficionados 2017–2018 season.

References

External links

Official website 
Futbolme team profile 
Unofficial website 
Club & Stadium History at Estadios de España 

 
Football clubs in Castile and León
Association football clubs established in 1923
1923 establishments in Spain
Sport in León, Spain
Segunda División clubs
La Liga clubs
Primera Federación clubs